Straelen (Low Rhenish: Strale) is a municipality in the district of Cleves, in North Rhine-Westphalia, Germany. It is located near the border with the Netherlands, approx. 10 km north-east of Venlo.

Twinning : Bayon in Meurthe-et-Moselle, since 7 July 1963. ( France ).

History

Straelen was first mentioned in Latin as Strala in 1063.

References

External links
 

Kleve (district)